The Kirkland Lake kimberlite field is a 165 to 152 million year old kimberlite field in the Kirkland Lake area of northeastern Ontario, Canada.

See also
Volcanism of Canada
Volcanism of Eastern Canada
List of volcanoes in Canada

References

Diatremes of Ontario
Jurassic volcanism
Volcanic fields of Canada